Passalora is a genus of fungi in the family Mycosphaerellaceae. It has about 250 species.

Species

Passalora abscondita 
Passalora acalyphae 
Passalora acanthicola 
Passalora acericola 
Passalora acori 
Passalora acosmii 
Passalora acrocomiae 
Passalora actaeae 
Passalora adenocalymmatis 
Passalora adenostemmatis 
Passalora aenea 
Passalora aesculina 
Passalora ageratinae 
Passalora agrostidicola 
Passalora ahmadii 
Passalora ahmesii 
Passalora ajrekarii 
Passalora alni 
Passalora alocasiae 
Passalora althaeigena 
Passalora amazonica 
Passalora ambrosiae 
Passalora amurensis 
Passalora angelicae 
Passalora annonacearum 
Passalora annonigena 
Passalora anomala 
Passalora antigoni 
Passalora antipus 
Passalora aphelandrae 
Passalora aratai 
Passalora arctostaphyli 
Passalora ariae 
Passalora arrabidaeae 
Passalora arracachae 
Passalora arrectaria 
Passalora arthraxonis 
Passalora artocarpi 
Passalora arunci-dioici 
Passalora asclepiadorae 
Passalora aseptata 
Passalora asprellae 
Passalora assamensis 
Passalora asteracearum 
Passalora asterata 
Passalora astragali 
Passalora atrides 
Passalora atropunctata 
Passalora atylosiae 
Passalora austroplenckiae 
Passalora avicularis 
Passalora bacilligera 
Passalora backmanii 
Passalora balansae 
Passalora bambusae 
Passalora barleriigena 
Passalora barringtoniae-acutangulae 
Passalora barringtoniicola 
Passalora barringtoniigena 
Passalora bartholomei 
Passalora bastardiae 
Passalora bataticola 
Passalora bauhiniae 
Passalora bauhiniicola 
Passalora bauhiniigena 
Passalora berkheyae 
Passalora berkheyae-maritimae 
Passalora bidenticola 
Passalora biformis 
Passalora bixae 
Passalora bocconiae 
Passalora boldoae 
Passalora bolleana 
Passalora bondartsevii 
Passalora brachyelytri 
Passalora brandenburgeri 
Passalora brasilianensis 
Passalora braunii 
Passalora broussonetiae 
Passalora bruchiana 
Passalora bryae 
Passalora buddlejae 
Passalora bunchosiae 
Passalora bupleuri 
Passalora buteae 
Passalora buteae-parviflorae 
Passalora caesalpiniae 
Passalora caesalpiniicola 
Passalora caespitosa 
Passalora cajani 
Passalora caladii 
Passalora caladiicola 
Passalora calpurniae 
Passalora calystegiae 
Passalora campi-silii 
Passalora campinensis 
Passalora capsicicola 
Passalora cardiostegiae 
Passalora cardopatii 
Passalora carlinae 
Passalora cassiae 
Passalora castellanii 
Passalora catalparum 
Passalora catenospora 
Passalora caulophylli 
Passalora cayaponiae 
Passalora celtidicola 
Passalora centrosematis 
Passalora cephalanthi 
Passalora cercidicola 
Passalora cerradensis 
Passalora chaerophylli 
Passalora chaetocalycina 
Passalora chaetomium 
Passalora chamaecristae 
Passalora chamaecristae-orbiculatae 
Passalora chamaecristicola 
Passalora chapadensis 
Passalora chionanthi 
Passalora chionea 
Passalora chonemorphae 
Passalora choristigmatis 
Passalora christianae 
Passalora chuppii 
Passalora ciferrii 
Passalora cimicifugae 
Passalora citricola 
Passalora citrigena 
Passalora clavata 
Passalora clematidina 
Passalora clematidis 
Passalora clematidis-gourianae 
Passalora clerodendri 
Passalora cnidii 
Passalora cnidoscolicola 
Passalora cnidoscolifolii 
Passalora coalescens 
Passalora cocculi-trilobi 
Passalora codonopsidis 
Passalora collomiae 
Passalora colocasiae 
Passalora colubrinae 
Passalora compacta 
Passalora compressa 
Passalora concors 
Passalora condensata 
Passalora congoensis 
Passalora consimilis 
Passalora convolvuli 
Passalora cordiae 
Passalora cordobensis 
Passalora cordylines 
Passalora corni 
Passalora cornicola 
Passalora cornifoliae 
Passalora costaricensis 
Passalora costi 
Passalora cotini 
Passalora crotonifolia 
Passalora crotonis 
Passalora crotonis-gossypiifolii 
Passalora crotonis-oligandri 
Passalora crotonophila 
Passalora cucurbiticola 
Passalora curcumae 
Passalora curvispora 
Passalora cyathulae 
Passalora cyperi 
Passalora dalbergiae 
Passalora dalbergiicola 
Passalora davillae 
Passalora deightonii 
Passalora delamonicae 
Passalora delicatissima 
Passalora delphinii 
Passalora desmanthi 
Passalora desmodii 
Passalora destruens 
Passalora dichanthii-annulati 
Passalora dichondrae 
Passalora diffusa 
Passalora digitariae 
Passalora diodiae 
Passalora dioscoreae-nipponicae 
Passalora dioscoreae-subcalvae 
Passalora dioscoreicola 
Passalora dioscoreigena 
Passalora diospyri 
Passalora dipterocarpi 
Passalora dissiliens 
Passalora dodonaeae 
Passalora dolichoides 
Passalora dombeyae 
Passalora dubia 
Passalora dulcamarae 
Passalora duplicans 
Passalora ecuadoriana 
Passalora effusa 
Passalora eitenii 
Passalora elaeochroma 
Passalora elata 
Passalora emblicae 
Passalora emmeorhizae 
Passalora eucalyptorum 
Passalora eugeniae 
Passalora euodiae 
Passalora eupatorii 
Passalora euphorbiae 
Passalora euphorbiicola 
Passalora fagarina 
Passalora ficina 
Passalora flemingiae 
Passalora flexuosa 
Passalora foeniculi 
Passalora foveolicola 
Passalora fraxini 
Passalora fraxinicola 
Passalora fujikuroi 
Passalora fuliginosa 
Passalora fuscovirens 
Passalora galactiae 
Passalora galii 
Passalora gayophyti 
Passalora gentianae 
Passalora geranii 
Passalora gerardiae 
Passalora gilbertii 
Passalora gliricidiae 
Passalora gliricidiasis 
Passalora gmelinae-arboreae 
Passalora gmelinicola 
Passalora goaensis 
Passalora gochnatiicola 
Passalora gomphrenicola 
Passalora gonatoclada 
Passalora gonostegiae 
Passalora gotoana 
Passalora granuliformis 
Passalora greciana 
Passalora grewiae 
Passalora grewiigena 
Passalora guanicensis 
Passalora guaranitica 
Passalora guimaranhesensis 
Passalora guoana 
Passalora guraniae 
Passalora gymnocladi 
Passalora haldinae 
Passalora halesiicola 
Passalora halstedii 
Passalora hamamelidis 
Passalora hameliae 
Passalora hariotii 
Passalora helianthi 
Passalora helianthicola 
Passalora helicteris 
Passalora helicteris-viscidae 
Passalora heliotropii 
Passalora heliotropiigena 
Passalora heterospora 
Passalora heterosporella 
Passalora holobrunnea 
Passalora hughesii 
Passalora hydrocotyles 
Passalora hydrophylli 
Passalora hyperici 
Passalora hyptidigena 
Passalora hyptidis 
Passalora ibatiae 
Passalora ilicis 
Passalora imperatae 
Passalora incarnata 
Passalora indogangetica 
Passalora iochromatis 
Passalora iresines 
Passalora isolonae 
Passalora isotomae 
Passalora jacquiniana 
Passalora janseana 
Passalora jatrophigena 
Passalora josensis 
Passalora koepkei 
Passalora kreiseliana 
Passalora lactucae 
Passalora lactucicola 
Passalora lantanae 
Passalora lantaniphila 
Passalora lateritia 
Passalora lathyri-aphacae 
Passalora latispora 
Passalora laurina 
Passalora laxa 
Passalora leeae 
Passalora legrellei 
Passalora leonotidis 
Passalora lepistemonis 
Passalora leprosa 
Passalora leptadeniae 
Passalora lettsomiae 
Passalora leucaenae 
Passalora liabi 
Passalora ligustricola 
Passalora liriodendri 
Passalora litseae 
Passalora lobeliae-cardinalis 
Passalora lobeliae-fistulosae 
Passalora lomaensis 
Passalora lonicerigena 
Passalora loranthincola 
Passalora lueheae 
Passalora lycopersici 
Passalora lygodii 
Passalora macarangae 
Passalora macfadyenae 
Passalora machaerii 
Passalora macroguttata 
Passalora maculicola 
Passalora magnoliae 
Passalora majewskii 
Passalora malkoffii 
Passalora malpighiae 
Passalora malpighiae-glabrae 
Passalora malvacearum 
Passalora manaosensis 
Passalora manihotis 
Passalora manitobana 
Passalora maritima 
Passalora markhamiae 
Passalora marmorata 
Passalora marsdeniicola 
Passalora medicaginis-lupulinae 
Passalora melanochaeta 
Passalora melochiae 
Passalora menispermi 
Passalora meridiana 
Passalora merremiae 
Passalora merrowii 
Passalora mertensiae 
Passalora mikaniae 
Passalora mikaniigena 
Passalora miliusae 
Passalora mimosae 
Passalora mimosigena 
Passalora minutissima 
Passalora mitracarpi-hirti 
Passalora mitragynae 
Passalora miurae 
Passalora momordicae 
Passalora monninae 
Passalora monrosii 
Passalora montana 
Passalora morrisii 
Passalora mucunae 
Passalora mucunicola 
Passalora munduleae 
Passalora murina 
Passalora musicola 
Passalora myracrodruonis 
Passalora myricae 
Passalora nattrassii 
Passalora neonepalensis 
Passalora nepalensis 
Passalora neriiindici- 
Passalora nervisequens 
Passalora nopomingensis 
Passalora noveboracensis 
Passalora obesa 
Passalora occidentalis 
Passalora oculata 
Passalora oenotherae 
Passalora okinawaensis 
Passalora oldenlandiae 
Passalora oleacearum 
Passalora oleariae 
Passalora omphacodes 
Passalora ougeiniae 
Passalora pachycarpi 
Passalora pachypus 
Passalora pallidissima 
Passalora papaveris 
Passalora papayae 
Passalora paradoxa 
Passalora paspalicola 
Passalora pastinacae 
Passalora paulowniicola 
Passalora pavoniicola 
Passalora peixotoae 
Passalora peixotoaegoianae 
Passalora peixotoaereticulatae 
Passalora peltophori 
Passalora penicillata 
Passalora pergulariae 
Passalora periclymeni 
Passalora perideridiae 
Passalora pfaffiae 
Passalora phalaridis 
Passalora phellodendricola 
Passalora philadelphi 
Passalora pilophila 
Passalora pilosae 
Passalora piperis 
Passalora pirozynskii 
Passalora pithecellobii 
Passalora pithoragarhensis 
Passalora platensis 
Passalora platyspora 
Passalora plectranthicola 
Passalora plucheae 
Passalora poasensis 
Passalora podophylli 
Passalora polygalae 
Passalora polygonati 
Passalora polygonatimaximowiczii 
Passalora polygoni 
Passalora pongamiicola 
Passalora prenanthis 
Passalora pruni 
Passalora pseudocapnioides 
Passalora psidii 
Passalora psidiicola 
Passalora pteleae 
Passalora pteridis 
Passalora puerariae 
Passalora puerariigena 
Passalora pulchella 
Passalora pumila 
Passalora punctum 
Passalora pyricola 
Passalora pyrigena 
Passalora pyrophila 
Passalora pyrostegiae 
Passalora pyrrosiae 
Passalora qualeae 
Passalora quercus 
Passalora rajakii 
Passalora ramularioides 
Passalora rauvolfiae 
Passalora raveneliae 
Passalora rhamnacearum 
Passalora rhoina 
Passalora rhois 
Passalora rhoisaromaticae 
Passalora ribisrubri- 
Passalora rolliniae 
Passalora rosae 
Passalora rosigena 
Passalora rottboelliae 
Passalora rubella 
Passalora rubida 
Passalora rufidula 
Passalora salicis 
Passalora saniculae 
Passalora sauropodis 
Passalora saururi 
Passalora sawadae 
Passalora scandicearum 
Passalora schefflerae 
Passalora schisandrae 
Passalora securidacae 
Passalora selinigmelini- 
Passalora senecionicola 
Passalora sequoiae 
Passalora serpentariae 
Passalora sesbaniae 
Passalora sidaecordifoliae 
Passalora sidaemysorensis 
Passalora sidarum 
Passalora sidigena 
Passalora sii 
Passalora simulans 
Passalora simulata 
Passalora solanacearum 
Passalora solani 
Passalora solanitorvi- 
Passalora solaniverbascifolii 
Passalora solaniphila 
Passalora spegazzinii 
Passalora squalidula 
Passalora stemodiae 
Passalora stephaniae 
Passalora sterculiacearum 
Passalora stigmaphylli 
Passalora stigmaphyllicola 
Passalora streptopi 
Passalora stromatica 
Passalora stylosanthis 
Passalora styracis 
Passalora subhyalina 
Passalora sublateritia 
Passalora sudanensis 
Passalora sweetiae 
Passalora symphoricarpi 
Passalora syzygii 
Passalora tabebuiae 
Passalora tabebuiaeochraceae 
Passalora taihokuensis 
Passalora tamala 
Passalora tarrii 
Passalora tecomariae 
Passalora telaria 
Passalora tephrosiae 
Passalora tephrosiaepurpureae 
Passalora tephrosiicola 
Passalora terrestris 
Passalora teucrii 
Passalora thalictri 
Passalora thalictrina 
Passalora tibouchinae 
Passalora tiliae 
Passalora tinosporae 
Passalora tithoniae 
Passalora togashiana 
Passalora tomentosae 
Passalora tranzschelii 
Passalora trematis 
Passalora trichophila 
Passalora trichostemmatis 
Passalora trifidae 
Passalora trigonellae 
Passalora triostei 
Passalora triseptispora 
Passalora triumfettae 
Passalora tungurahuensis 
Passalora turbinae 
Passalora tylophorae 
Passalora ubatubensis 
Passalora umbrata 
Passalora urostigmatis 
Passalora uttarkashiensis 
Passalora vaginae 
Passalora valerianae 
Passalora valerianicola 
Passalora vanderystii 
Passalora venturioides 
Passalora verbeniphila 
Passalora verbesinae 
Passalora verniciae 
Passalora vexans 
Passalora viburni 
Passalora viburnisargentii 
Passalora vicosae 
Passalora vincetoxicihirsuti 
Passalora vitis 
Passalora vitispiadezkii 
Passalora vitisripariae- 
Passalora voandzeiae 
Passalora wangii 
Passalora weigelae 
Passalora weigelicola 
Passalora winteriana 
Passalora xenogrewiae 
Passalora xylopiae 
Passalora yuccaegloriosae 
Passalora zanthoxyli 
Passalora ziziae 
Passalora ziziphi 
Passalora ziziphicola

References

Capnodiales
Dothideomycetes genera
Taxa described in 1849
Taxa named by Elias Magnus Fries